Kurrajong may refer to
 Any of several species of Australian trees in the genus Brachychiton
 Kurrajong, New South Wales, a town in the Blue Mountains
 Kurrajong, Western Australia, a ghost town in Western Australia
 Kurrajong electorate, one of the five electorates for the Australian Capital Territory Legislative Assembly
 The Early Learning Centre at Pulteney Grammar School, South Australia
 Building on Darlinghurst Road, Darlinghurst, built in 1927 and rumoured to have been the first building in Sydney to use reinforced concrete in its construction

Australian Aboriginal words and phrases